Thomas Cox ( – 12 September 1690), known as "The Handsome Highwayman", was an English highwayman, sentenced to death and hanged at Tyburn. He had a reputation for a spirited nature and it is reported that when asked if he wished to say a prayer before being hanged, he kicked the ordinary and the hangman out of the cart taking him there.

Early life
Cox lived during the Restoration period. According to Alexander Smith's A Complete History of the Lives and Robberies of the Most Notorious Highwaymen, Footpads, Shoplifts and Cheats of Both Sexes (1719), Tom Cox was the youngest son of a gentleman living at Blandford, Dorsetshire.

Career

Smith wrote that Cox's father left him money but having squandered it, Cox travelled to London where he fell in with a gang of highwaymen. He was tried at the assizes at Gloucester and Winchester, and for his life at Worcester, but acquitted each time. At Worcester he married a woman with a fortune of £1,500 but having dissipated it in less than two years he returned to crime. He held up Thomas Killigrew, jester to King Charles II, who asked Cox if he was in earnest. Cox is supposed to have replied, "I am in earnest, for though you live by jesting, I can't; therefore deliver your money, before a brace of balls make the sun shine through your body". In Sussex he robbed a Mr Hitchcock, a dishonest attorney of New Inn, of 350 guineas, leaving him one guinea to continue his journey. On the road from Lichfield, Cox met Madam Box, a brothel keeper of Fountain Court in the Temple, whom he knew, who told him that if he robbed her, she would see him hang, but he took her money anyway.

Cox was arrested for a highway robbery near Chard, Somerset, but according to Smith managed to break out of Ilchester prison after the jailer fell asleep drunk. He made his escape towards Coventry on a stolen horse and on the way robbed two other highwaymen when they tried to hold him up, killing one. He also robbed a nobleman he had befriended of a diamond ring and 100 guineas before killing the man's horse. His final hold-up, according to Smith, was the robbery of a farmer (Thomas Boucher) on Hounslow Heath. This last crime was Cox's undoing when the farmer, happening to be in London, saw Cox coming out of his lodgings in Essex Street near Strand, resulting in Cox's capture in nearby St Clement Danes churchyard. Cox was committed to Newgate Prison pending trial for his crimes, where he lived in luxury in the Press Yard.

Death and legacy
Cox was sentenced to death at the Old Bailey for the robbery of Boucher and hanged at Tyburn on 12 September 1690 in his 25th year. On the way to the gallows he was asked by the ordinary, Samuel Smith, if he wished to join the other condemned men in prayer. He responded by kicking Smith and the hangman out of the cart carrying him to the gallows. Samuel Smith recorded that:

He was listed in James Caulfield's Blackguardiana: or, a dictionary of rogues, bawds, pimps, whores, pickpockets, shoplifters, &c. (1793) and features in a song sung by a character in the novel Rookwood (1834) by W. Harrison Ainsworth as follows:

References 

1660s births
1690 deaths
17th century in London
Year of birth uncertain
English highwaymen
People executed by the Kingdom of England by hanging
People executed by Stuart England
People from Blandford Forum